Sıhhiye is an underground station on the M1 line of the Ankara Metro in Çankaya, Ankara. The station is located beneath Atatürk Boulevard at its intersection with Celal Bayar Boulevard. Connection to TCDD Taşımacılık train service at Yenişehir is available. Sıhhiye was opened on 29 December 1997 along with the M1 line.

Nearby Places of Interest
Ankara Palace of Justice
School of Language and History - Geography 
Ankara University Medical School
Abdi İpekçi Park

References

External links
EGO Ankara – Official website
Ankaray – Official website

Railway stations opened in 1997
Ankara metro stations
1997 establishments in Turkey